The Sâncraiul Almașului is a right tributary of the river Almaș in Romania. It flows into the Almaș in Sutoru.

References

Rivers of Romania
Rivers of Sălaj County